En Tiempo Real is a live album by Peruvian singer-songwriter Gian Marco released by 11 y 6 Discos in 2010. It was the second live album of his career and first one to be released in DVD format.

Background and Release
The album was a recorded during a special concert Gian Marco gave to his fans on October 22, 2010. The album was well received by the public and critics praising it for its acoustic live music with no breaks or sound effects as well as for the way that Gian  Marco was demonstrating his abilities with a Peruvian instrument such as a charango. The album was quickly certified gold in Perú.

Commercial Performance
The album was a success in Perú where it was certified gold after just 2 weeks of its release and eventually certifying platinum.  It was released on December 10, 2010 and by the beginning of 2011 it had already sold 5,680 copies earning its gold certification and just 2 weeks later it earned a platinum certification once the album sales reached 10,000 copies.

Tour
Gian Marco embarked on the En Tiempo Real Tour in order to promote the album which started in Latin America and continued onto the United States. The U.S. leg began in Miami and continued onto New Jersey, Houston, and Seattle.

Track listing

Certifications and sales

References

Gian Marco live albums
2010 live albums
Spanish-language live albums